Humorama, a division of Martin Goodman's publishing firm, was a line of digest-sized magazines featuring girlie cartoons by Bill Ward, Bill Wenzel, Dan DeCarlo, Jack Cole and many others.

In addition to the cartoons, the magazines also displayed black-and-white photos of pin-up models, including Bettie Page, Eve Meyer and stripper Lili St. Cyr, plus actresses, including Joi Lansing, Tina Louise, Irish McCalla and Julie Newmar.

One of Martin Goodman's family members, Abe Goodman, headed this division. The line was published from at least the mid-1950s to mid-1960s. These titles were profitable for the company because the contents were inexpensive and production costs were minimal in comparison to the more complex full-size magazines published by the company.

Humorama titles
 Breezy
 Cartoon Comedy-Parade
 Cartoon Parade
 Comedy
 Eyeful of Fun
 Fun House
 Gaze
 Gee-Whiz
 Humorama
 Instant Laughs
 Jest
 Joker
 Laugh Circus
 Laugh Digest
 Laugh It Off!
 Laugh Riot
 Popular Cartoons
 Popular Jokes
 Romp
 Stare
 Snappy
 Zip

References

External links
 Cover Gallery

1950s establishments in New York (state)
1960s disestablishments in New York (state)
Publishing companies of the United States
Publishing companies established in the 1950s
Publishing companies disestablished in the 1960s
Publishing companies based in New York City
Defunct companies based in New York City